Air rail, Air-rail or AirRail may refer to:

 Airport rail link, a type of rail service providing passenger rail transport from an airport to a nearby city or region
 Air-rail alliance, a type of alliance between airlines and railway operating companies
 Air-Rail Link, an automated people mover linking Birmingham Airport and Birmingham International railway station in the UK
 RailAir, a name used by a number of bus and coach services designed to connect the rail network to airports in the UK